Koninklijke Voetbal Club Westerlo (often simply called Westerlo) is a Belgian professional football club located in the municipality of Westerlo in the province of Antwerp. Since 1997–98, Westerlo has been mostly playing in the Belgian Pro League, save for a short stint in the Belgian Second Division between 2012 and 2014.  Their highest finish is a 6th place in 1999–00, 2003–04 and 2008–09. They have won one Belgian Cup. The only player who has ever been called up for the Belgium national football team while at Westerlo is Toni Brogno (7 caps, all of them while at Westerlo).

The club was founded in 1933, receiving the matricule number 2024. Their colours are yellow and blue. They play their home matches at the Het Kuipje.

History
K.V.C. Westerlo was founded in the city of Westerlo by students in 1917, and it was named Sportkring De Bist Westerlo. After five years of existence, the club retired. The club Bist Sport was created in 1931 and it changed its name to Sportkring Westerlo two years later. At that time. some players left the club to found Westerlo Sport, the ancestor of K.V.C. Westerlo. In 1939, the club won its league for the first time. Five years later, Sportkring Westerlo and dissident Westerlo Sport decided to merge in spite of the rivalry between the teams, and the new club was called V.C. Westerlo.

It became champion of the Antwerp second division in 1960.  Eight years later it played its first season at the national level in Promotion and it won its league to play the third division in 1969. At the end of the season, Westerlo missed a third title in a row, finishing second behind Eupen. The next year, the club was relegated after the playoff and it stayed in the Promotion for ten seasons. The club then underwent two relegations in a row and thus played in the Antwerp second division in 1982–83. Westerlo was then promoted for three consecutive years to qualify for the third division once again. In 1993, the club promoted to the second division and then to the first division in 1997. In 1996, the club added the prefix Koninklijke (meaning "Royal" in Dutch) to its name.

On 18 June 2019 it was officially announced that the club was taken over by Turkish businessman Oktay Ercan. He immediately made it clear that KVC Westerlo will remain a regional family club, and that more attention will be paid to the social dimension and sporting ambitions. Ercin expressed his commitment in 2019 to a year-long plan called 'KVC Westerlo 2024'.

Stadium
Westerlo plays its home matches at Het Kuipje, which is Dutch for "The Small Tank". It is believed to be reference to the Feijenoord Stadion that is nicknamed De Kuip. Its capacity is 8,035.

Honours
Belgian Second Division/Belgian First Division B
Winners (2): 2013–14, 2021–22
Runners-up (1): 1996–97
Belgian Second Division Final Round
Winners (1): 1997
Belgian Cup:
Winners (1): 2000–01
Runners-up (1): 2010–11
Belgian Supercup
Runners-up (1): 2001

European record

Current squad

Out on loan

Other players under contract

Coaching staff

Managers

 Louis Leysen (1982–84)
 Jos Heyligen (1984–86)
 Marcel Corens (1986–88)
 Dirk Verbraken (1989)
 Raymond Jaspers (1989)
 Dirk Verbraken (1990–92)
 Jos Heyligen (1992–93)
 Werner Helsen (1993)
 Stef Verelst (1993)
 Barry Hulshoff (1994–95)
 Erwin Vandenbergh (1995)
 Franky Dekenne (1996)
 Jos Heyligen (1996–99)
 Jan Ceulemans (July 1, 1999 – June 30, 2005)
 Herman Helleputte (July 1, 2005 – June 30, 2007)
 Jan Ceulemans (July 1, 2007 – May 19, 2012)
 Frank Dauwen (May 22, 2012 – April 18, 2013)
 Dennis Van Wijk (May 1, 2013 – January 2015)
 Harm van Veldhoven (January 6, 2015 – November 25, 2015)
 Bob Peeters (November 26, 2015 – 2016)
 Jacky Mathijssen (September 14, 2016 - June 21, 2017)
 Vedran Pelić (June 21, 2017 – December 5, 2017)
 Bob Peeters (Since December 5, 2017)

References

External links
 Official Website
 KVC Westerlo at UEFA.COM
 KVC Westerlo at EUFO.DE
 KVC Westerlo at Weltfussball.de
 KVC Westerlo at Football Squads.co.uk
 KVC Westerlo at national Football Teams.com
 KVC Westerlo at Football-Lineups.com

 
Association football clubs established in 1933
Football clubs in Belgium
1933 establishments in Belgium
Organisations based in Belgium with royal patronage
Belgian Pro League clubs
Westerlo